Logaršče (in older sources also Logaršče Rakovec) is a dispersed settlement in the hills south of the Bača Valley in the Municipality of Tolmin in the Littoral region of Slovenia.

Name
The name Logaršče is a syncopation of *Logarišče, a collective noun derived from logar 'forest owner', referring to the local environment and related to place names such as Logarji and Logarše (a hamlet of Praprotno Brdo).

Church

The local church is dedicated to Saint Lucy and belongs to the Parish of Podmelec.

References

External links

Logaršče on Geopedia

Populated places in the Municipality of Tolmin